Martin Ewald Wollny (March 20, 1846, Berlin – January 8, 1901, München) was a German founder of agrophysics (Agrikulturphysiker).

He taught at the Technical University of Munich (since 1872).

See also
Rainfall simulator

Literary works 
 Editor & contributor of the "Forschungen auf dem Gebiete der Agrikulturphysik", 20 vols., 1878-1898
 Saat und Pflege der landwirtschaftlichen Kulturpflanzen, 1885
 Die Kultur der Getreidearten, 1887
 Der Einfluss der Pflanzendecke und der Beschattung auf die physikalischen Eigenschaften und Fruchtbarkeit des Bodens, 1877
  Die Zersetzung Der Organischen Stoffe und die Humusbildungen. Mit Rücksicht auf die Bodencultur, 1897

Wollny Ewald

1846 births
1901 deaths
Academic journal editors
German agronomists
Academic staff of the Technical University of Munich
German male writers